The Strabane transmitting station is a broadcasting and telecommunications facility located at Legfordrum and situated very close to the town of Strabane, in County Tyrone, Northern Ireland (Grid Reference: H393947, GNR: IH393947). It is owned and operated by Arqiva.

The transmission antennas surmounting the structure are contained within a fibreglass cylinder. Constructed in 1963, it came into service on 18 February of that year.

History
It was originally commissioned by the Independent Television Authority to bring ITV signals (provided by Ulster Television) to the west of Northern Ireland, including the districts of Derry and Enniskillen on 405-line VHF, using Channel 8 (Band III). The transmitter commenced full service on Monday 18 February 1963. 405 line television was discontinued in the UK in 1985.

When UHF television came to Northern Ireland, main transmitters were commissioned at Limavady and Brougher Mountain, near Omagh. However this left a gap in the Strabane and Newtownstewart areas, so in July 1977 UHF television was added to the Strabane site. Due to the elevation of the antennas (584 m above sea level), a 2kW effective radiated power was sufficient to cover a very wide area, with coverage available well into County Donegal.

In 2001, the site was installed with a transmitter for Score Northern Ireland, a regional digital radio multiplex.

Digital switchover took place in Northern Ireland in October 2012, when analogue TV transmissions from this station were replaced by digital transmissions. The coverage area is approximately the same as the analogue services, and there are three digital multiplexes transmitted.

Services listed by frequency

Digital radio (DAB)

Digital television Until 04/09/2019

Digital television After 04/09/2019

Analogue television

See also
List of masts
List of tallest structures in the United Kingdom
List of radio stations in the United Kingdom

References

External links
 The Transmission Gallery entry for Strabane transmitting station
 TV Coverage Map
 http://skyscraperpage.com/diagrams/?b54396
 Strabane Transmitter at thebigtower.com

Radio masts and towers in Europe
Transmitter sites in Northern Ireland